"Slip On Through" is a song by the American rock band the Beach Boys from their 1970 album Sunflower. Written by Dennis Wilson and Gregg Jakobson, it was issued as a single with the B-side "This Whole World". It did not chart.

Authorship
"Slip On Through" was originally credited to Dennis Wilson alone. After Brother Records archive manager Alan Boyd consulted with Wilson's publishing and estate, a credit for Gregg Jakobson was added to the song on the 2021 compilation Feel Flows.

Recording
An early version of the song was recorded at Gold Star Studios in Hollywood. The final version was recorded at the Beach Boys' studio on October 6, 1969.

Reception
Brian Wilson said, "It was a really dynamic song. Dennis, I was very proud of, because he really rocked and rolled on that one. Dennis did really interesting energetic things on that."

Personnel
Sourced from Craig Slowinski.

The Beach Boys
 Al Jardine – backing vocals
 Mike Love – backing vocals
 Brian Wilson – backing vocals
 Carl Wilson – backing vocals, rhythm guitar
 Dennis Wilson – lead and backing vocals, piano, additional guitar through Leslie speaker, production; cowbell (uncertain)
 Bruce Johnston – backing vocals

Additional musicians and production staff
 Jack Conrad – lead guitar
 Daryl Dragon – bass
 Dennis Dragon – drums, congas
 John Audino – trumpet
 Tony Terran – trumpet
 Stephen Desper – engineer

References

External links
 

1970 songs
1970 singles
The Beach Boys songs
Songs written by Dennis Wilson
Song recordings produced by the Beach Boys